KAUT-TV (channel 43) is an independent television station in Oklahoma City, Oklahoma, United States. It is owned by Nexstar Media Group alongside NBC affiliate KFOR-TV (channel 4). Both stations share studios in Oklahoma City's McCourry Heights section, while KAUT-TV's transmitter is located on the city's northeast side.

History

Early history
The UHF channel 43 allocation in Oklahoma City was originally assigned to Christian Broadcasting of Oklahoma Inc. – a religious nonprofit corporation headed by George G. Teague, a local evangelist and co-founder of the Capitol Hill Assembly of God – which filed an application with the Federal Communications Commission (FCC) for a license and construction permit on April 4, 1977, proposing to sign on a non-commercial religious television station on the frequency. The FCC Broadcast Bureau granted the license to Christian Broadcasting of Oklahoma on November 17, 1978; two months later in January 1979, the group applied to use KFHC-TV as the planned station's callsign. On July 13, 1979, the Teague group announced it would sell the license to Golden West Broadcasters (a joint venture between actor/singer and Ravia, Oklahoma native Gene Autry and The Signal Companies that, at the time, also owned independent station KTLA [now a CW affiliate] in Los Angeles) for $60,000; the FCC granted approval of the transaction on January 24, 1980.

VEU

The station first signed on the air on October 15, 1980, as KAUT, initially operating as a pilot station for Golden West's subscription service Video Entertainment Unlimited (VEU). (The callsign, which references controlling group stakeholder Autry, was chosen by Golden West two months prior to sign-on; a "-TV" suffix would be added to the callsign on January 27, 1983.) It was the first broadcast outlet for the service, which Golden West's pay television unit, Golden West Subscription Television, Inc., initially launched on May 1 as the microwave-relayed Golden West Entertainment Network in Omaha, Nebraska and Memphis, Tennessee. KAUT – which originally operated from a  studio and office facility located at 11901 North Eastern Avenue (south of the John Kilpatrick Turnpike and southwest of the Burendale Heights North section) in northeastern Oklahoma City – was the sixth commercial television station to sign on in the Oklahoma City market and the fourth such station to operate on the UHF band.

The VEU service – which occupied the channel 43 signal weekdays from 7:00 p.m. until sign-off at 2:00 a.m. and weekends from 1:00 p.m. to 2:00 a.m. – carried uncut theatrically released feature films, entertainment specials (including concerts and Vegas revues), sporting events (including college football and basketball games from the Oklahoma Sooners, football and basketball games and wrestling matches involving the Oklahoma State Cowboys, and NBA games featuring the Dallas Mavericks, some of which commenced play before 7:00 p.m., resulting in fans often missing the start of many contests) and, for an additional monthly fee, softcore pornographic films (aired as part of Night VEU, an adult-oriented programming block that aired at or after 11:00 p.m., depending on the evening's film schedule, seven nights a week). VEU could be purchased for a fee of $22.50 per month (equivalent to $ in  adjusted for inflation). Prospective subscribers were required to rent a special set-top decoder box to unencrypt the channel 43 signal during hours when the station carried VEU programming in order to receive the service. (A special lockout device designed to restrict children from viewing R-rated and pornographic movies could be purchased for a one-time-only charge of $15.) The decoders were designed so that KAUT engineers could re-encrypt the signal from the Eastern Avenue studios if it became aware that a viewer (who figured out the technical simplicities of the VEU signal encryption) was receiving the service illegally by either rewiring the rented decoder boxes or devising their own.

As Golden West and KAUT was launching VEU, multichannel television franchises offering cable-originated premium services such as Home Box Office (HBO) and Showtime had already become widely available throughout central Oklahoma. Cable service was provided within Oklahoma City proper through Cox Cable (which commenced its Oklahoma City operations in April 1980, servicing the western half of the city [up to Western Avenue]) and Pan Oklahoma Communications (a buildout venture that was majority owned by Cox under a consortium with African American co-founders and investors, which concurrently began serving northeastern Oklahoma City and nearby Forest Park; Cox would acquire Pan Oklahoma outright in December 1983), and in outer suburbs through Multimedia Cablevision (which covered cities such as Bethany, Choctaw, Del City, Edmond, Moore and Yukon as well as Tinker Air Force Base) and American Cablevision (which served most of Midwest City, excluding the Tinker area, until it was integrated into Multimedia's suburban Oklahoma City properties in May 1984). Wireless cable was also available area-wide via TVQ (which launched in October 1978 as a single-channel over-the-air distributor of HBO and Superstation WTBS, later to include supplementary sports content from [eventual KAUT sister station] WGN-TV in Chicago).

VEU eventually expanded to KNBN-TV (now CW-affiliated sister KDAF) in Dallas–Fort Worth when that station debuted on November 1, and had proposed expansions into Chicago, Atlanta and Providence, Rhode Island that never took place. (In the case of Atlanta, Golden West was beaten out in operating an STV service by Subscription Television of Greater Atlanta, which launched its Superstar TV service over the ironically call-lettered upstart independent WVEU [now CW owned-and-operated station WUPA].) With Cox and Multimedia increasing their subscribership, offering up to 30 channels at close to the same price as VEU, the service less attractive to viewers; KAUT ceased carrying VEU programming on October 17, 1982. (The service continued to operate until September 30, 1984, when VEU's replacement Dallas outlet, KTWS-TV [now MyNetworkTV owned-and-operated station KDFI], ceased carrying the service due to subscriber declines associated to the widespread presence of cable television in the Dallas–Fort Worth market.)

Music videos, FNN and general entertainment
KAUT commenced entertainment programming on November 3, 1980, three weeks after the VEU launch. At that time, it became the third independent station to sign on in the Oklahoma City market – after KOKH-TV (channel 25, now a Fox affiliate), which converted from a non-commercial educational independent into a commercial independent on October 1, 1979, and KGMC (channel 34, now CW affiliate KOCB), which signed on four weeks later on October 28. The station initially maintained a mixed information and entertainment schedule, running local news programming from sign-on at 12:00 p.m. until 5:00 p.m., and a limited schedule of first-run syndicated programs (initially consisting of only two shows, The Merv Griffin Show and game show Liar's Club) weekdays from 5:00 to 7:00 p.m. Later that month, KAUT reached an agreement with the Trinity Broadcasting Network (TBN) to temporarily carry some of the Christian-oriented religious network's programs from 8:00 a.m. to 12:00 p.m. Monday through Friday and from 8:00 a.m. to 7:00 p.m. on weekends until TBN's upstart owned-and-operated station KTBO-TV (channel 14)—which was originally scheduled to sign on in September—was able to correct technical issues with its transmitter facility; the agreement concluded when KTBO officially debuted over channel 14 on March 6, 1981.

On February 2, 1981, KAUT shifted its news block two hours later (from 2:00 p.m. to 7:00 p.m.), which allowed for the station's news department to provide additional weather coverage during the late afternoon for that year's spring severe weather season; with that move, channel 43 carried a morning block of music videos from 8:00 to 9:00 a.m. and a mix of syndicated talk and religious programs from 9:00 a.m. to 2:00 p.m. After the station discontinued the daytime local news format in September 1981, KAUT began filling daytime slots with older feature film westerns—most of which had starred Autry—on a temporary basis, and also added some drama series, sitcoms and animated series to its schedule.

Concurrent with the cancellations of the local music programs TMC 43 and Oklahoma Country Live, the station overhauled its lineup in September 1982, and expanded its schedule to 17 hours per day. At that time, channel 43 began offering a simulcast of the Financial News Network (which would merge with CNBC in 1989) each weekday from 10:30 a.m. to 3:00 p.m. and, after the removal of VEU programming, from 9:30 to 10:00 p.m. The rest of the weekday schedule during this timeframe featured cartoons in the mid-afternoon, and a mix of "traditional family shows" from 5:00 to 7:00 p.m. After channel 43 dropped VEU programming on October 17, nighttime hours began to be filled by classic series as well as the syndicated national evening newscast Independent Network News (which was distributed by eventual KAUT owner Tribune Broadcasting, and was dropped by channel 43 around the time of the program's September 1986 relaunch as USA Tonight). The following year, FNN programming was dropped and replaced by additional comedy and drama series, while movies began airing in prime time. In 1984, cartoons were added to the station's morning lineup and an expanded inventory of sitcoms was added during the evening. KAUT ceased carrying FNN programming in 1985, as a result of the channel discontinuing its over-the-air affiliations to operate strictly as a cable-exclusive service.

On February 28, 1985, Golden West—whose assets had been technically been for sale under a divestiture order from the California state government since shortly after the May 1980 death of Autry's wife, Ina Mae—sold KAUT to Atlanta-based Rollins Communications (owned by O. Wayne Rollins, co-founder of pest control services company Rollins Inc.) for $5.5 million. The sale received FCC approval on April 10, and was finalized two months later on June 11. Subsequently, on June 12, 1986, Des Moines, Iowa-based Heritage Broadcasting acquired a controlling interest in Rollins Communications – with the combined company forming Heritage Media – in a two-tiered tender acquisition worth $260 million. The Heritage purchase received FCC approval on September 18.

Fox affiliation; aborted sale to OETA

On July 25, 1986, in advance of the network's launch, News Corporation announced that it had reached an agreement with Rollins Communications, in which KAUT was named the Oklahoma City charter affiliate of the Fox Broadcasting Company. Even though KOKH-TV was the leading independent in the market, Reliance Capital Group–which assumed ownership of KOKH's parent company at the time, Blair Broadcasting, to stave off a hostile takeover by minority stockholders—had turned down Fox's offer to affiliate with channel 25, due to disagreements over scheduling of the network's inaugural program, late-night talk show The Late Show Starring Joan Rivers, concerned about potential disruption to the station's movie lineup. KAUT-TV affiliated with Fox when the fledgling network inaugurated programming on October 9, 1986. Though it was technically a network affiliate, Channel 43 continued to be programmed as a de facto independent station. Even after the network's programming expanded with the launch of a three-hour Sunday night lineup in April 1987, Fox offered prime time programs exclusively on weekends until September 1989, when it began a five-year expansion towards a nightly prime time schedule. (Fox would not air prime time programs on all seven nights of the week until January 1993, after KOKH assumed the local affiliation rights to the network.) KAUT–which, in compliance with Fox's stricter branding requirements, began phasing out its original "TV-43" branding in favor of identifying as "KAUT Fox 43" in September 1989–continued to air a movie at 7:00 p.m. on nights when the network did not offer any programming. Around that time, the station acquired more cartoons for its weekday afternoon lineup, and launched Midnight Shopper, a home shopping program produced by locally based production company Snyder & Co. that aired weekend late nights.

Despite just barely ranking as a top-40 Nielsen market at the time, the Oklahoma City market did not have enough television-viewing households to support what were essentially three independent stations, nor was there a supply of programming on the syndication market that could sufficiently fill their respective schedules. In the summer of 1988, the Visalia, California-based Pappas Telecasting Companies proposed a deal with Busse Broadcast Holdings (a trust company created independently of Gillett Holdings in the name of broadcasting executive George N. Gillett Jr.'s children, and which had recently acquired channel 25 at the time) to purchase KOKH, which would have resulted in programming changes at KAUT and its independent competitors. Under the complex $30-million asset transfer proposal, Pappas would acquire the programming inventories of both KGMC and KAUT (including channel 43's Fox affiliation rights) and integrate many of their acquired programs onto channel 25's schedule, solidifying KOKH's status as the market's dominant independent. Simultaneously, Heritage Media would sell KAUT to a religious broadcaster, which would convert that station to a non-commercial religious format. Seraphim Media would in turn donate the license and certain intellectual assets of KGMC to the Oklahoma Educational Television Authority (OETA)–with the intent of converting it into a PBS member station–for $1 million, with Pappas acquiring equipment and property assets owned by the station for an additional $1 million.

Governor Henry Bellmon voiced concerns with OETA's involvement in the transaction, suggesting that the purchase of a second Oklahoma City station would result in the authority, which had limited appropriations to adequately operate its existing state network as it stood, constantly requesting additional state funding. On August 17, 1988, OETA submitted an FCC application to purchase KGMC, after, in advance of a fundraising deadline set for that date, Pappas offered to provide a $1 million contribution toward purchasing the station, contingent upon the company completing the KOKH purchase. After its board of directors voted against the KGMC proposal that September, OETA decided to change course: on November 1, 1988, Heritage Media announced it would sell KAUT to the OETA for $1 million (along with assets worth $7.75 million and a non-compete agreement worth $500.000). Pappas would also lease the KAUT transmitter facility to OETA for 25 years for an annual operating fee of $1, and contribute an additional $1 million should the acquisition be completed. Concurrently, General Media announced it would sell KGMC to Cleveland, Ohio-based Maddox Broadcasting Corp.—an African American-owned group run by media executive Chesley Maddox, which intended to refocus that station to primarily feature a mix of religious and Home Shopping Network (HSN) programming—for $3.6 million, including certain intellectual assets that Pappas Telecasting would not acquire under the proposal (such as transmitter facilities, studio equipment and licenses) worth $2.6 million.

Although OETA planned to fund the conversion of channel 43 partly through start-up grants—including a $75,000 award by management at ABC affiliate KOCO-TV (channel 5)—in a move that hamstrung its attempt to acquire KAUT, the Oklahoma Legislature incorporated stipulations into the bill appropriating OETA's funding for FY1990 that prohibited the use of state funds "for any operational or capital expense of the proposed second educational television channel in Oklahoma City" and from proposing any additional funding to finance the acquisition if it did not obtain sufficient funding from private sources. In late January 1989, Busse management denied Pappas's request to extend the completion deadline for the purchase past its scheduled January 31 deadline. The entire transaction fell through on February 3, when Busse formally terminated the purchase agreement with Pappas. Just three days earlier, the FCC had also dismissed the respective transfer applications for KGMC and KAUT. The in-limbo license donation created uncertainty over the station's future, resulting in the departures of 16 KAUT employees (all of whom sought work at other Heritage-owned television stations), and a reduction in advertising sales.

OETA ownership and PBS membership

On April 23, 1991, three years after the first sale proposal involving the public broadcaster fell through, Heritage Media announced that it would donate the KAUT license and certain non-license assets (including transmitter facilities and master control equipment) to OETA. The agreement—which partially mirrored the aborted Pappas proposal, and stipulated that the donation be contingent on the approval of Heritage's acquisition of KOKH—also included a two-year option for the authority to purchase the station's remaining assets for $1.5 million. Heritage concurrently announced that it would buy KOKH from the Gillett-controlled Busse Broadcast Holdings, with the intent to move some of KAUT's programming to channel 25. Post-acquisition, OETA planned to increase the authority's telecourse programming by 250%, largely through programs that would fill the KAUT lineup (at that time, Oklahoma had the highest total of students who obtained their college credit through telecourses). Under the 1987 proposal by Pappas, OETA had planned to air 22 additional hours of college telecourse programs over KAUT each week to supplement the 8½ weekly hours offered by the state network. OETA solicited private funds totaling $300,000 to pay for educational programming that would be shown on the restructured channel 43. Other operational assumptions and acquisition of the KAUT's North Eastern Avenue studios and transmission tower would require additional funding by the Oklahoma Legislature, which was now more receptive of the authority acquiring KAUT. The sale received FCC approval on June 27, and was finalized on August 12.

Channel 43 became a PBS member station on August 15, 1991—becoming the city's second non-commercial educational station, after OETA flagship station KETA-TV (channel 13)—while much of its syndication inventory and Fox affiliation migrated to channel 25. Thirty employees (among them, KAUT general manager Harlan Reams, who took over that same position at KOKH), and other equipment and intellectual property held by channel 43, were also included in the transfer. The station's programming conversion was part of a national education demonstration initiative formed between OETA's Board of Directors, the OETA Foundation Board of Trustees, and Heritage Media; PBS senior vice president for education services Sandy Welch, and management with the Children's Television Workshop collaborated with the consortium in the development of the station's new format, which OETA and PBS intended to use as a model for instructional and educational programming on a national level. Under OETA ownership, Channel 43 reduced its schedule to 14 hours per day initially (from 7:00 a.m. to 11:00 p.m.), mirroring the OETA network's programming hours on Sunday through Thursdays during that timeframe. To fill the vacated programming time, cable providers throughout central and western Oklahoma designated KTLC's assigned channel slot as a timeshare feed to carry other cable networks. (The station's channel slot on Cox Cable's Oklahoma City area system—which carried QVC on channel 13 during KTLC's off-time from January 1992 until channel 43 dismembered from PBS—suffered from direct pickup interference by, ironically, the VHF analog signal of sister station KETA-TV, an issue that Cox's move of KAUT/KTLC to channel 13 in January 1987 was claimed to address. These issues eventually resulted in Cox moving KAUT's basic tier slot from channel 13 to channel 16 in 2007.)

As a PBS station, much of KAUT/KTLC's programming consisted of same-day rebroadcasts of programs featured on the OETA network, alongside some programs from American Public Television and other syndicators that OETA had granted channel 43 the exclusive local broadcast rights for. The station's initial format as a PBS member featured instructional, informational and fitness programs (such as Body Electric, Homestretch, A.M. Weather and Sit and Be Fit) each weekday from 7:00 to 10:00 a.m. and 12:00 to 1:00 p.m., and instructional programs and select PBS news, science and documentary series (including among others, The MacNeil/Lehrer NewsHour [later retitled The NewsHour with Jim Lehrer in 1995], which, until 1993, originally aired on a one-hour delay from its initial OETA early evening broadcast) from 9:00 p.m. until sign-off. Afternoons and late evenings on Saturdays and Sundays as well as Sunday mornings featured discussion series (such as Tony Brown's Journal and Firing Line) and instructional programs for high school and college credit; weekends in prime time featured mostly repeats of PBS arts and documentary programs that were first aired on OETA during the previous week. The majority of its lineup, however, consisted of children's programming sourced from PBS and other distributors. Atypical of most PBS stations (which usually only air such programs during the daytime hours), children's shows made up the bulk of the station's weekday schedule from mid-morning to early evening, with occasional breakaways for PBS programming aimed at older audiences. In what would become a gradual expansion of its children's program offerings, in December 1991, the station began carrying shows aimed at a preschooler to preteen audience (such as Reading Rainbow, Shining Time Station, Long Ago and Far Away and Degrassi Junior High) between 8:00 a.m. and 2:00 p.m. on Sundays.

The station's call letters were changed to KTLC on January 17, 1992, in reflection of the branding it adopted upon the August 1991 format change, "The Literacy Channel," a relatively contradictory moniker as the station's programming, while educational in form, was not entirely focused on literacy. Within three years under the "Literacy Channel" format, channel 43 began altering its program schedule due partly to financial difficulties tied to reductions in the OETA's budget appropriations. On July 3, 1993, KTLC cut its weekday and weekend morning schedules (from 8:00 a.m. to 12:00 p.m.), which had largely been ceded to instructional programs and, on weekday mornings, also included some children's programming; the move was originally intended to last until the end of August 1993, in a cost-saving effort intended to save about $4,000 per month during that summer amid a 17.9% reduction in the OETA's state funding for FY1993, but continued past its intended timespan. At that time, the OETA board requested for permission by the OETA Foundation for KTLC to conduct two on-air fund raisers during the fall and winter of 1993. KTLC launched its first on-air fundraising event, "Celebration '93," on September 11 of that year, which earned only $2,000 in public donations over the eight-day-long event.

On July 2, 1994, KTLC dropped five additional hours of programming on weekend afternoons (from 12:00 to 5:00 p.m.), reducing its broadcast schedule on Saturday and Sundays to between 4:00 p.m. and midnight. Concurrently on July 4, it added morning children's and instructional programs as part of a re-expanded 16-hour weekday schedule (running from 7:00 a.m. to 12:00 a.m.; the weekday 6:00 a.m. hour was subsequently restored six months later on January 2, 1995). By 1995, channel 43 had expanded its children's programming to encompass the vast majority of its weekday schedule (from its 6:00 a.m. sign-on until 9:00 p.m.) and half of its Saturday and Sunday schedules (from its 5:00 p.m. sign-on until 9:00 p.m.); KTLC also moved its fitness programs to the 11:00 a.m. hour on weekdays (later moved to between 8:00 and 9:00 a.m. by September 1997), and phased out most of weekday instructional programming. The remainder of its schedule during that period consisted of select PBS news, science and documentary series from late evening until sign-off and a broad mix of adult education programs (such as Learn to Read, Destinos: An Introduction to Spanish, Computer Chronicles, GED on TV and Literary Visions) during weekend late evenings.

As a UPN affiliate
OETA eventually ran into difficulties trying to fund and operate two stations in the Oklahoma City market. In the fall of 1997, the authority announced it would sell channel 43; it would find its eventual buyer as a result of the displacement of another network's local affiliation. On July 21, 1997, the Sinclair Broadcast Group signed an agreement with Time Warner, in which KOCB and four other Sinclair-operated stations affiliated with the United Paramount Network (UPN)—WPTT-TV (now MyNetworkTV affiliate WPNT) in Pittsburgh, WNUV (now a CW affiliate) in Baltimore, WSTR-TV (now a MyNetworkTV affiliate) in Cincinnati, and KRRT (now CW affiliate KMYS) in San Antonio—would become affiliates of The WB. UPN attempted to block the affiliation deal through lawsuits, claiming that Sinclair struck the deal without giving the network any required written notice that it would terminate its contracts with the affected stations; a summary judgment issued by the Baltimore City Circuit Court on December 8, 1997, ruled in favor of Sinclair. As the order now allowed the affected Sinclair stations to begin switching to The WB starting on January 15, 1998, UPN began scrambling to find a new affiliate in the market.

On January 8, 1998, two weeks before KOCB assumed the WB affiliation, the Paramount Stations Group (a subsidiary of UPN co-parent Viacom) reached an agreement to purchase KTLC from the Oklahoma Educational Television Authority for $23.5 million. OETA planned to use the proceeds from the sale to Paramount—which was made possible because OETA maintained the commercial classification of the channel 43 broadcast license after the Heritage Media donation—to fund the construction and sign-on of the digital broadcast transmitters of KETA-TV and its repeaters, which the network was mandated to complete by December 2003 under an FCC directive to public television stations. KOCB became the Oklahoma City affiliate of The WB on January 18, 1998; from the network's January 1995 launch until the switch, The WB had been available in the market through the superstation feed of the network's Chicago affiliate, WGN-TV (which was carried on Cox Communications, Multimedia Cablevision, and other local cable and satellite providers). While the switch gave The WB an over-the-air presence in the Oklahoma City market, it consequently resulted in many area residents that did not have either an outdoor antenna that could receive UPN affiliates from Tulsa (KTFO-TV [now MyNetworkTV affiliate KMYT-TV) or Sulphur (KOKT-LP, now defunct) or a subscription to satellite provider Dish Network (which carried New York City owned-and-operated station WWOR-TV [now MyNetworkTV owned-and-operated station] as a default UPN feed) being unable to view UPN programs within the market for the next six months.

Paramount took over the operations of channel 43 on June 15, 1998, 3½ weeks before the purchase formally received FCC approval on July 8. The station—which also adopted the callsign KPSG, in reference to its new owner (which had earlier applied the base "PSG" call letters on channel 43's new Philadelphia sister station, WPSG [now a CW owned-and-operated station])—reverted into a general entertainment outlet as the market's new UPN affiliate at 5:00 a.m. on June 20. The conversion was originally scheduled to occur on June 1, but was twice postponed—first until June 13, then to June 15 and finally to June 20—because of technical difficulties and delays in finalizing the sale to Paramount (the issues leading to the second postponement were unrelated to a tornado outbreak that hit central Oklahoma on the evening of the 13th). Through Viacom's ownership stake in UPN, channel 43 became the first television station in Oklahoma to serve as an owned-and-operated station of a major commercial broadcast network (preceding the conversion of KOPX-TV [channel 62] and its Tulsa sister, KTPX-TV, into charter O&Os of Pax TV by two months). Most of channel 43's schedule during this time consisted of off-network sitcoms originally aired between the 1950s and the 1980s, select first-run syndicated talk shows and drama series, cartoons and feature films. Under conditions included by OETA in the sale agreement, Paramount/Viacom also was required to allow OETA to lease airtime on KPSG after the station joined UPN, under a five-year agreement which included requirements to air PBS educational shows supplied by the member network each weekday from 9:00 a.m. to 12:00 p.m., along with simulcast blocks of OETA's "Festival" and "AugustFest" programming for eight hours each weekend during the duration of the March and August pledge drives. (KPSG would cease airing OETA-leased children's programs on May 28, 1999.)

On December 12, 1998, the station re-adopted its former KAUT-TV call letters in tribute to founder Gene Autry, who had died from lymphoma at age 90 on October 2. In addition, the station also several of Autry's feature films during the week of December 6 (including among others his debut film, Tumbling Tumbleweeds, The Phantom Empire, and Bells of Capistrano). A weekend-long afternoon marathon of several of Autry's films that aired on December 12 and 13, was capped by an hour-long tribute special hosted by longtime friend, veteran Los Angeles radio personality Johnny Grant. Channel 43 culled all remaining PBS programming from its lineup in the fall of 2001, at which point it became a general entertainment station full-time. KAUT-TV gradually replaced many of the classic sitcoms featured during its weekday afternoon and evening lineup with talk shows and court shows. Cartoons were phased out by August 2003, after UPN ceased offering children's programs with the dissolution of the Disney's One Too block; the station would retain some children's programming in the form of live-action educational series compliant with Children's Television Act regulations on weekdays until September 2008 (when it relegated such programs to Saturday and Sunday mornings).

On June 14, 2005, citing the company's stagnating stock price, Viacom announced that it would split its assets into two separate companies; CBS, UPN and their owned-and-operated stations, Showtime Networks and other "slow-growth" businesses owned by Viacom became part of the new CBS Corporation, with most of its other assets (most notably, Paramount Pictures, and the MTV Networks and BET Networks cable television units) became part of a newly incorporated company that assumed the Viacom name. In the meantime, CBS—which renamed its broadcast television subsidiary, by then known as Viacom Television Stations Group, to CBS Television Stations following the split—chose to sell KAUT to The New York Times Company for an undisclosed price. The sale was finalized on November 4, 2005, creating a duopoly with NBC affiliate KFOR-TV (channel 4); KAUT subsequently migrated its operations to KFOR's existing facility on Britton Road and Northeast 93rd Street in northeast Oklahoma City. (The former Eastern Avenue studio building is now occupied by local construction firm Wynn Construction Company.)

As a MyNetworkTV affiliate
On January 24, 2006, UPN parent company CBS Corporation and WB network parent Time Warner (through its Warner Bros. Entertainment division) announced that they would dissolve the two networks to create The CW Television Network, a joint venture between the two media companies that initially featured programs from its two predecessor networks as well as original first-run series developed for The CW. Subsequently, on February 22, 2006, News Corporation announced the launch of MyNetworkTV, a network developed as a joint venture between then-sibling subsidiaries Fox Television Stations and Twentieth Television (the former is now part of Fox Corporation, and the latter now operates as a unit of The Walt Disney Company by way of Disney's 2019 acquisition of 21st Century Fox) primarily to serve as a network programming option (in lieu of converting to a general entertainment independent format) for UPN and WB stations that were not chosen to affiliate with The CW.

When the network released its initial list of stations, The CW erroneously identified KAUT-TV as its Oklahoma City charter affiliate, despite the fact that CBS had already sold the station to The New York Times Company. On May 2, in a joint announcement by the network and Sinclair Broadcast Group, KOCB was confirmed as The CW's Oklahoma City affiliate. Since the network chose its charter stations based on which of them among The WB and UPN's respective affiliate bodies was the highest-rated in each market, KOCB was chosen to join The CW over KAUT as it had been the higher-rated of the two stations at the time of the agreement's signing. The day prior, KAUT became one of a handful of UPN-affiliated stations not owned by Fox Television Stations to remove on-air brand references to UPN—rebranding as simply "43"—and cease promotion of the network's programs. For three months, it was unclear whether KAUT would become an independent station once again or join MyNetworkTV. In an email sent by station management on August 22, just two weeks before the network launched, KAUT was confirmed to be Oklahoma City's MyNetworkTV affiliate.

KAUT-TV remained a UPN affiliate until September 4, 2006, with the network's Sunday late-night repeat block as the final UPN offering carried by the station. Channel 43 officially joined MyNetworkTV when that network launched the following day (September 5), at which point KAUT changed its branding to "OK 43"—instead of following the "My (channel number)" branding conventions that MyNetworkTV outlined for its affiliates or using a modification of the network's multi-pattern "blue TV" logo—a change that was accompanied by a marketing campaign focusing on the station's history and origins with Gene Autry; KOCB remained a WB affiliate until September 17, before affiliating with The CW when that network debuted a day later (September 18). With the new network affiliation, KAUT became one of the few stations in the United States to have been affiliated with both Fox and MyNetworkTV (both now operated by the Fox Corporation).

On January 4, 2007, The New York Times Company sold its nine television stations (including KAUT and KFOR-TV) to Local TV, a holding company operated by private equity group Oak Hill Capital Partners, for $530 million; the sale was finalized on May 7. On April 11, 2011, KAUT rebranded as "[KAUT] Freedom 43 TV", an approach made to cater to, according to a statement by then-KFOR/KAUT president and general manager Jim Boyer, "all Oklahomans who believe in faith, freedom and patriotism," specifically the large military population in the Oklahoma City market. Newscasts that KFOR produced for the station were altered to include stories and profiles of interest to conservatives and the military community.

Return to independence
On June 20, 2012, independent station KSBI (channel 52)—via its YouTube channel—announced in a promo for its fall 2012 programming slate that it would join MyNetworkTV on September 17. When KAUT-TV formally reverted to an independent on September 17, MyNetworkTV programs were replaced with off-network syndicated sitcoms during the 7:00 to 9:00 p.m. timeslot. On September 16, KAUT began carrying select classic television programs provided by Antenna TV, which airs mainly on digital subchannels in most of the network's markets (including locally on the DT2 feed of sister station KFOR, which remained a full-time affiliate), in certain timeslots. (Weekday programs from the network were relegated from daytime to the overnight hours in November 2012, and were then cut to weekends only in late December 2013.) In KAUT's case, until the arrangement was discontinued in May 2014, the programs were simulcast from Antenna TV's national feed to compensate for current-day syndication rights.

Local TV was acquired by the Tribune Company in a $2.75 billion deal completed on December 27, 2013.

Sinclair purchase attempt; sale to Nexstar

Sinclair Broadcast Group entered into an agreement to acquire Tribune Media for $3.9 billion on May 8, 2017, including the assumption of $2.7 billion in Tribune-held debt. Due to Sinclair owning KOKH and KOCB, the company agreed to divest KAUT to Howard Stirk Holdings for $750,000 but planned to maintain operational control of the station via shared services and joint sales agreements. KOKH would additionally be divested to Standard Media as part of a $441.1 million deal. These divestitures were nullified on August 9, 2018, after Tribune Media terminated the merger and filed a breach of contract lawsuit; those actions followed the FCC voting to bring the merger up for review and lead FCC commissioner Ajit Pai publicly rejecting it.

After the Sinclair merger attempt collapsed, Nexstar Media Group announced their purchase of Tribune Media on December 3, 2018, in an all-cash $6.4 billion deal, including assumption of Tribune-held debt. The transaction closed on September 19, 2019.

Subchannel history

KAUT-DT2
KAUT-DT2 is the Court TV-affiliated second digital subchannel of KAUT-TV, broadcasting in standard definition on UHF digital channel 40.2 (or virtual channel 43.2 via PSIP). On cable, KAUT-DT2 is available on Cox Communications channel 220.

On December 24, 2014, KAUT launched a digital subchannel on virtual channel 43.2 as an affiliate of This TV; as such, KAUT became the first Tribune-owned television station to affiliate with the network since its purchase of the Local TV group (Tribune assumed original co-owner Weigel Broadcasting's equity share of the network in November 2013, while retaining its structure as a joint venture with Metro-Goldwyn-Mayer). The network had been absent from the Oklahoma City market for the three weeks preceding the subchannel's launch, as This TV's previous affiliate, KSBI, decommissioned its DT2 subchannel on December 1—following Griffin Communications' assumption of that station's operations—citing low ratings. In January 2015, KAUT-DT2 was added by Cox Communications, which carries the subchannel on digital channel 220. On October 28, 2019, coinciding with the enforcement of a predated affiliation agreement with Katz Broadcasting that saw 19 other former Tribune stations (including three that were spun off to either the E. W. Scripps Company or Tegna) also dropping This TV in favor of the Katz-owned network, KAUT-DT2 became an affiliate of Court TV. (As a result, This TV does not have an over-the-air affiliate in the Oklahoma City market.) Although the network natively transmits in the 16:9 aspect ratio, KAUT-DT2 (as KAUT-DT4 had done beforehand) transmits Court TV programming in a horizontally condensed 4:3 format.

KAUT-DT3
KAUT-DT3 is the Ion Mystery-affiliated third digital subchannel of KAUT-TV, broadcasting in standard definition on UHF digital channel 40.3 (or virtual channel 43.3 via PSIP). The subchannel is not currently available on Cox Communications in the Oklahoma City area or on other cable providers throughout the market.

On November 16, 2015, Katz Broadcasting announced it had signed an agreement with Tribune Media to carry Escape (renamed Court TV Mystery in September 2019) on stations owned by the group in four markets. KAUT launched a tertiary subchannel on virtual channel 43.3 to serve as an Escape affiliate on February 1, 2016. Although the network natively transmits in the 16:9 aspect ratio, KAUT-DT3 transmits Court TV Mystery programming in a horizontally condensed 4:3 format. (As Katz's subchannel-leasing agreements are structured as such that duplicate affiliations exist among some of its networks in certain markets, KAUT-DT3 shares the Court TV Mystery affiliation with KSBI, which began carrying the network—under the former Escape brand—on its DT5 subchannel in October 2018.)

KAUT-DT4
KAUT-DT4 is the Cozi TV-affiliated fourth digital subchannel of KAUT-TV, broadcasting in standard definition on UHF digital channel 40.4 (or virtual channel 43.4 via PSIP). The subchannel is not currently available on Cox Communications in the Oklahoma City area or on other cable providers throughout the market.

On December 10, 2018, as part of the announcement of the network's relaunch, Katz Broadcasting announced it had signed an agreement with Tribune Media to carry Court TV (a multicast network developed by Katz as a revival of the branding and original legal proceedings/true crime format utilized by the present-day comedic reality-focused cable network TruTV from July 1991 until January 2008) on stations owned or operated by the group in 22 markets. Upon the network's debut on May 8, 2019, KAUT launched a subchannel on virtual channel 43.4 (or UHF digital channel 40.4) to serve as an affiliate of Court TV, which aired over the subchannel until it was decommissioned in coincidence with Court TV's relocation to KAUT-DT2 on October 28. The DT4 subchannel was restored six weeks later on December 9, 2019, as an affiliate of the NBCUniversal-owned classic television network Cozi TV. (As of the time of the addition, KAUT-DT4 shares the Cozi TV affiliation with Enid-licensed KBZC-LD [channel 42], which had switched its DT5 subchannel from QVC to Cozi in September 2019.)

Programming
Syndicated programs broadcast on KAUT-TV include Maury, The Drew Barrymore Show, Inside Edition, Black-ish, Friends, The Doctors, Who Wants to Be a Millionaire, Pawn Stars, The 700 Club and The Goldbergs. KAUT may occasionally take on the responsibility of running NBC network shows in place of regular programming in the event that extended breaking news or severe weather coverage is carried on KFOR (the first such instance in which this occurred was on May 21, 2013, while KFOR-TV ran extended coverage of the aftermath of an EF5 tornado that struck Moore).

Locally produced non-news programs
On January 4, 1982, the station premiered two music and dance-based programs for its weekday late afternoon schedule. The first program, TMC 43—"TMC" standing for "Top Music Channel"—was a two-hour-long program (airing from 4:00 to 6:00 p.m.) that featured amateur dancers performing  to popular music as well as showcasing music videos from top artists. Hosted by local personality Les "Boogie Man" Michaels (who would later serve as a disc jockey at Enid radio station KOFM [103.1 FM]), the first episode of the program—which replaced a feature film presentation that had been airing in that slot since the dissolution of the TV-43 Newswatch format—had only 12 dancers. That number would sharply increase to 117 by the end of the week; by the following Friday, more than 300 local teens were dancing in two large soundstages at KAUT's now-former Eastern Avenue facility. Shortly afterwards, the show began issuing tickets to some of the more popular dancers (such as Marty Melton, Tanya Eli and Robyn Church), with all dancers being required to bring a date to show tapings. Its lead-out program, Oklahoma Country Live, was an hour-long country music dance show hosted by Wade Carter (then the music director at KXXY-FM [96.1]) that was broadcast from the Spurs nightclub, located on 25th Street (near South Prospect Avenue and Interstate 35) in southeast Oklahoma City. (The building now houses the Latin nightclub El 2002.) With adequate viewership failing to materialize, both shows were canceled by that fall after eight-month runs. In the case of TMC 43, mothers picketed at KAUT's Eastern Avenue studio to keep the show on the air, with the spokeswoman for the picketers, Carolyn Pierce, pointing out the show's contribution to the local community by keeping teens off of the street. The final TMC 43 broadcast—airing on September 17, 1982, the same day Oklahoma Country Live aired its final episode—hosted around 250 teens as Michaels read letters from heartbroken teens and parents.

Since January 2007, the station had run a rebroadcast of KFOR-TV's political discussion program Flash Point at 11:30 a.m. on Sunday mornings (two hours after its initial broadcast on KFOR). From September 2006 until September 2017, KAUT also produced 2 Movie Guys, a Saturday prime time movie presentation that featured comedic wraparound segments included before and after commercial breaks; the program was hosted by Lucas Ross (who also serves as social media correspondent for Rise and Shine) and Ryan Bellgardt (who also serves as the station's announcer). Ross and Bellgardt also appeared together on the Friday edition of Rise and Shine, providing reviews for movies being released in theaters that week. From 2009 to 2016, Ross and Bellgardt also hosted half-hour, holiday-themed 2 Movie Guys sketch specials that substituted certain newscasts seen on KAUT and KFOR (which both preempted all regularly scheduled newscasts airing between 7:00 a.m. and 9:30 p.m. on the holiday) each Christmas Day.

Since 2012, KAUT has also served as the local over-the-air broadcast home of Final Descent Outdoors, a locally produced, nationally syndicated hunting show that airs on the station each Sunday morning at 5:30 and 10:00 a.m. The station also carried Dog Talk, a half-hour program aimed at dog owners that originally aired on KSBI from 2012 to 2014 (when it was discontinued after Griffin Communications purchased that station); the program—which aired on KAUT as part of the station's Saturday morning educational program block—moved to channel 43 in February 2015 and was discontinued permanently in January 2016.

Sports programming
From 1982 to 1986, KAUT-TV carried college basketball games involving the Oklahoma Sooners, the Oklahoma State Cowboys and the Oklahoma City Stars as part of an extensive sports broadcasting contract with local advertising agency AADCO. (The package also included rights to OSU Cowboys wrestling and baseball games, though those rights were given to Cox Cable for carrying one of its community access channels after KAUT declined to air those events.) The station's relationship with the Sooners resumed from 2004 to 2014, under a partnership with the University of Oklahoma's Sooner Sports Network broadcasting unit, which gave KAUT the local telecast rights to the Sooners' men's and women's college basketball games; in addition until 2011, Sooner Sports' agreement with channel 43 included the exclusive local rights to the weekly coaches programs for the Sooners' basketball and football teams.

From 1981 to 1983, KAUT aired select Major League Baseball game telecasts featuring the Los Angeles Angels (which were then owned by Gene Autry and had their telecasts produced by sister station KTLA). KAUT also carried regular season MLB games involving the Texas Rangers (which were produced by KTVT in Dallas–Fort Worth under the original contract, and by KDFI under the later agreement) from 1984 to 1990 and again during the 2007 season, and games featuring the Kansas City Royals (produced by then-NBC affiliate WDAF-TV [now a Fox affiliate and Tribune sister station] in Kansas City) from 1984 to 1988. From 1984 to 1987, the station carried regular season and occasional playoff minor league baseball games involving the Oklahoma City 89ers (now the Oklahoma City Dodgers). The agreement marked the first time that the 89ers had their games aired on local television, and was the only contract involving Oklahoma City's minor league team and a local broadcast television station (all 89ers' game telecasts that aired after the contract concluded had aired locally on Cox Cable and Multimedia Cablevision's community access channels).

KAUT also broadcast NBA games involving the Dallas Mavericks and the Houston Rockets (respectively distributed by KTVT and KTXH) during the 1988–89 season. From January 2006 until May 2008, KAUT broadcast Oklahoma High School Sports Express, a weekly sports wrap-up program hosted by former KFOR sports reporter Van Shea Iven; the rights to that program moved to KOKH-TV in August 2008, where it would remain until May 2010.

Newscasts

KFOR presently produces 12½ hours of locally produced newscasts each week for KAUT (consisting only of 2½ hours each weekday); the station does not currently broadcast any news programming on Saturdays or Sundays. In addition to airing local newscasts produced by KFOR-TV, channel 43 also will take on the responsibility of simulcasting KFOR-TV's severe weather coverage in place of regular programming in the event that a tornado warning is issued for any part of the station's main over-the-air broadcast area.

Newscast history

On November 3, 1980, less than two months after channel 43 signed on, KAUT began offering news programming, in the form of a daytime local rolling news format. Initially airing Monday through Fridays from 12:00 to 5:00 p.m., the block—branded as TV-43 Newswatch—featured a mix of local news headlines (which were updated each hour), national and international news content sourced from CNN, feature reports and call-in segments. It was anchored by Chris Davala (who served as the station's news and public affairs director), Ralph Combes (a veteran anchor/reporter with previous stints at WKY-TV [later KTVY and now KFOR], KOCO-TV and KWTV), Linda Farrel and Ken Hansen; all of the anchors conducted the newscasts in rotating three-hour shifts, with Davala anchoring solo for the final hour of the block. Bob Barry Jr. (who would later move to KTVY to become the deputy sports anchor to his father, Bob Barry Sr., after channel 43 discontinued the all-news format) served as sports director and Gene Moore served as chief meteorologist. By March 1981, the all-news format was shifted by two hours (running from 2:00 to 7:00 p.m.), putting it in direct competition with early evening local and network newscasts on KTVY, KOCO and KWTV.

Jerry Birdwell—the station's original vice president and general manager, who had previously served as news director for Los Angeles sister station KTLA—opted to utilize an all-news format in part because it seemed a viable alternative to the traditional programming offered by other independent stations, and as a means to contain programming costs by not acquiring more expensive syndicated programs. Plans called for KAUT to eventually extend the news block to 14 hours per day. Ultimately though, the news format struggled to build an audience (averaging a 1 ratings share point, with most of its viewers watching in waiting areas of local businesses, which neither Nielsen nor Arbitron factored into their local television viewership totals) and never became truly profitable. After 10 months on the air, KAUT shuttered its news department on September 4, 1981, resulting in the layoffs of all but three members of its 23-person news staff; the time period allocated to Newswatch 43 was replaced with syndicated series and movies. In analyzing the failure of the format, Birdwell suggested that Oklahomans did not catch onto "this type of live, extended, locally produced news," and that the increased station competition hampered its ability to attract viewers.

Locally produced newscasts returned to channel 43 after a 25-year absence once The New York Times Company assumed control of the station. On June 5, 2006, KFOR-TV debuted a half-hour prime time newscast at 9:00 p.m. for KAUT under the title Oklahoma's NewsChannel 4 at 9:00 on 43 (the title was altered to correspond with KAUT's rebranding as "OK43" in September of that year). The program—which has aired only on Monday through Friday nights since its premiere—directly competes against an hour-long prime time newscast in that timeslot on Fox affiliate KOKH-TV, which debuted as the market's first local prime time news program when channel 25 launched its current news department ten years earlier in May 1996. The KFOR-produced program would eventually gain additional prime time news competitor on April 5, 2016, when ABC affiliate KOCO-TV began producing a half-hour nightly newscast for its MeTV-affiliated digital subchannel. Originally anchored by Ernie Paulsen and former KOCO weekend evening anchor Cherokee Ballard, the newscast included a commercial-free block leading off the broadcast for the first five years of its run, featuring the day's top headlines and an updated weather forecast segment during the first ten minutes of the program (modeled after the Eleven @ 11:00 late news format). At that time, KFOR also began producing local weather inserts for KAUT to air during the syndicated morning show The Daily Buzz (which had aired from 5:00 to 8:00 a.m. from July 2004 until the station ceased carrying the third hour of the program after Rise & Shine premiered, with the remaining two hours continuing to air until September 2010, when it replaced The Daily Buzz with second runs of syndicated programs seen on KFOR in the time slot).

On September 8, 2008, KFOR began producing a two-hour morning newscast for the station (separate from the traditional morning newscast seen on channel 4), under the title Rise and Shine Oklahoma (later shortened to simply Rise and Shine in April 2012). In addition to airing opposite Today on KFOR-TV, the program—which airs weekdays from 7:00 to 9:00 a.m.—competes against the third and fourth hours of KOKH's four-hour in-house morning newscast, which premiered in April 2007 as a three-hour broadcast; over time, Rise and Shine evolved into a more irreverent format, infusing more serious news content with light-hearted and humorous news stories and features (formatted similarly to that of Chicago sister station WGN-TV's morning newscast).

On July 12, 2009, KFOR became the first station in the Oklahoma City market to begin broadcasting its local newscasts in high definition; the KAUT broadcasts were included in the upgrade, and were converted to HD on July 14. With the rebranding as "Freedom 43" in April 2012 (at which time the 9:00 newscast was retitled Freedom 43 News), production of KAUT's newscasts moved from KFOR's main news set to a secondary set—which was designed to resemble army barracks—at the Britton Road facility formerly shared by the two stations; the station also incorporated feature reports focused on Oklahoma's military community during its evening newscasts. KAUT moved production of the 9:00 p.m. newscast to KFOR's main news set in November 2016, when the program was reformatted as a more conventional prime time newscast (eventually restoring the NewsChannel 4 branding to the evening newscast in February 2017, and moving production of the broadcast to a section of KFOR's main news set after KFOR/KAUT moved to the duopoly's current Britton Road facility in August of that year).

Local program hosts
Flash Point
 Kevin Ogle – moderator; also reporter and fill-in anchor
 Todd Lamb – political commentator/Flash Point panelist
 Mike Turpen – political analyst/Flash Point panelist

Notable former on-air news staff
 Bob Barry Jr. – sports director (1980–1981 and 2006–2015; deceased)
 Linda Cavanaugh – anchor/reporter (2006–2017)

Technical information

Subchannels
The station's digital signal is multiplexed:

Analog-to-digital conversion and spectrum repack
KAUT-TV launched a digital signal on UHF channel 40 in June 2005. The station originally planned to transmit on UHF channel 42 by the May 1, 2002 deadline for full-power television stations to sign on a digital signal; however, the assignment had also been given to then-fellow UPN affiliate KTFO (now KMYT-TV) in Tulsa, which led then-KAUT owner Viacom Television Stations Group to apply to relocate its digital channel assignment to UHF 40 in order to prevent co-channel interference with KTFO's digital feed. KAUT discontinued regular programming on its analog signal, over UHF channel 43, on June 12, 2009, as part of the federally mandated transition from analog to digital television. The station's digital signal remained on its pre-transition UHF channel 40, using PSIP to display KAUT-TV's virtual channel as 43 on digital television receivers.

As a part of the broadcast frequency repacking process following the 2016–2017 FCC incentive auction, KAUT-TV relocated its digital signal to UHF channel 19 at 10:00 a.m. on December 1, 2018, using PSIP to display its virtual channel number as 43.

ATSC 3.0 deployment
Deployment of the ATSC 3.0 digital transmission standard commenced in the Oklahoma City market on October 8, 2020, when KAUT-TV began transmitting a 3.0 signal as the market's designated NextGen TV host station. KAUT acts as the 3.0 host for four Oklahoma City-area stations owned by broadcasters associated with the Pearl NextGen TV consortium that concurrently deployed the fledgling standard: sister station KFOR (through Nexstar), ABC affiliate KOCO-TV (owned by Hearst Television), and the duopoly of Fox affiliate KOKH-TV and CW affiliate KOCB (owned by Sinclair Broadcast Group). The station's 3.0 signal transmits over UHF digital channel 19.5001, using PSIP to display KAUT's virtual channel as 43.1 on digital television receivers; KAUT, in turn, farms the ATSC 1.0 signals of its main feed and subchannels as host signals transmitted by KFOR (for KAUT-DT1), KOKH (for KAUT-DT2 and KAUT-DT3), and KOCB (for KAUT-DT4), remapped to their respective virtual channels (as PSIP 43.x) on digital television receivers.

ATSC 3.0 lighthouse

Repeater stations
To reach viewers throughout the 34 counties comprising the Oklahoma City Designated Market Area, KAUT-TV extends its over-the-air coverage area through a network of eight low-power digital translator stations–all of which transmit using PSIP virtual channel 43—encompassing much of Western Oklahoma that distribute its programming beyond the  range of its broadcast signal.

References

External links
  – KAUT-TV official website
 kfor.com – KFOR-TV official website

AUT-TV
Independent television stations in the United States
Court TV affiliates
Ion Mystery affiliates
Cozi TV affiliates
Nexstar Media Group
Television channels and stations established in 1980
1980 establishments in Oklahoma
Former Viacom subsidiaries
ATSC 3.0 television stations